Parachorius is a genus of Asian Scarabaeidae or scarab beetles.

Species 
BioLib lists:
 Parachorius asymmetricus Tarasov, 2017
 Parachorius bolavensis Tarasov, 2017
 Parachorius fukiensis (Balthasar, 1960)
 Parachorius fungorum Kryzhanovsky & Medvedev, 1966
 Parachorius globosus Arrow, 1931
 Parachorius gotoi (Masumoto, 1986)
 Parachorius hookeri Arrow, 1931
 Parachorius humeralis (Arrow, 1907)
 Parachorius javanus (Boucomont, 1914)
 Parachorius longipenis Tarasov, 2017
 Parachorius maruyamai Masumoto, Ochi & Sakchoowong, 2012
 Parachorius matsudai Ochi, Pham & Kon, 2016
 Parachorius newthayerae Tarasov, 2017
 Parachorius nudus (Sharp, 1875)
 Parachorius peninsularis (Arrow, 1907)
 Parachorius pseudojavanus Tarasov, 2017
 Parachorius schuelkei Tarasov, 2017
 Parachorius semsanganus Tarasov & Keith, 2011
 Parachorius solodovnikovi Tarasov, 2017
 Parachorius thomsoni Harold, 1873

References

Scarabaeidae genera
Beetles of Asia